Las leyendas: el origen is a 2022 Mexican animated horror-comedy film as part of the Leyendas animated franchise. Produced by Ánima, the film is an origin story focused on the little Calavera duo, Finado and Moribunda, who must leave their home in Pueblo Calaca while looking out for a human baby.

Las leyendas: el origen was released on the streaming platform ViX+ platform on 10 August 2022. The film was initially scheduled for a theatrical release in 2020 in Mexico, but was postponed due to the COVID-19 pandemic.

Premise
Two Calavera children must look after a human infant after crossing through an eternal mirror, absorbing energy of a portal that separates the worlds between life and death.

Voice cast (Spanish)

Bruno Bichir as Aniceto
Emiliano Ugarte as Finado
Paola Ramones as Moribunda
Eduardo España as Evaristo
Alex Casas as Chimo
Cajafresca as Moira
Daniela Ibañez as Eva
Germán Fabregat as Deveriux
Tommy Rojas as Pascual
Eduardo Ramírez Pablo as Chuletl

Development
Ricardo Arnaiz, the creator of the Leyendas characters, served as the director of the film, marking his return to the franchise since The Legend of La Nahuala and his first collaboration outside of Animex Producciones. The film was originally titled tentatively as The Legend of... and then The Legend of Finado and Moribunda. The film was first teased on social media.

Release
It was originally slated for an April 2020 release, but was postponed due to the COVID-19 pandemic in the country.

The film was released on the ViX+ service on August 10, 2022.

References

External links

Ánima Estudios films
Mexican animated films
Mexican children's films
2020s Spanish-language films
Mexican animated horror films
Films set in Mexico
Films postponed due to the COVID-19 pandemic
Animated feature films
Vix (streaming service) original films